Koen Onzia (born 1961 in Geel) is a Belgian ballet dancer and dance teacher.

In 1979, he won a gold medal at the Prix de Lausanne.

Onzia was a soloist with Béjart Ballet Lausanne.

References

Belgian male ballet dancers
People from Geel
Living people
1961 births
Date of birth missing (living people)
Dance teachers
20th-century Belgian people